Li Yingying is the name of:

Li Yingying (cricketer) (born 1991), Chinese cricketer
Li Yingying (volleyball) (born 2000), Chinese volleyball player

See also
Lee Ying Ying (born 1997), Malaysian badminton player